On the Wrong Track is a 1983 Hong Kong action drama film directed by Clarence Fok and starring Andy Lau in his third film and first leading film role. The film co-stars Jeem Yim, Elliot Ngok, Prudence Liew and introducing the then newcomer actress Winnie Chin.

Plot
Paul Chan (Andy Lau) is a well-meaning, mild mannered, 17-year-old secondary school student. However, he often hangs out with his hot-headed, rebellious younger brother, Dee (Jeen Yim) and friends and engage in destructive activities such as blowing up a rich man's car after being insulted by him. Their father, Larry (Elliot Ngok) is a prison officer who is strict towards his sons. One time, one of their friends humiliate a girl and getting into a fight with her boyfriend's gang and is stopped by police officer King Kong, who threatens Paul. At night, Paul and Dee sneak out of home to join their friends and resume the fight where Dee gets injured and stays with a prostitute while Paul sneaks back home but it was caught by Larry, who was informed by King Kong about what happened. The next day in school, Paul gets punished when his brother and classmates were fooling around and put a underwear on his head before he, his brother and his classmates get in trouble for bringing weapons to class to prepare for a fight with students of a rival school. As a result, Larry punishes Paul and Dee by having them clean the house without giving them dinner. However, at the middle of the night, Larry cooks noodles for Dee but neglects Paul.

The next morning, Paul receives a mail that he failed his SAT. While dejected, he bumps into Sze, whom he discovers to be a Vietnamese refugee. Later, Larry informs Paul and Dee he plans marry his girlfriend (Winnie Chin), which displeases Dee, who storms out and meets with his friends while Paul follows. They happen to see King Kong and steal his car which Dee uses to engage in an illegal use where he ends up flipping and injured. As they get home, Larry slaps Dee as well as Paul for not looking out for his brother and throws them out the house. The next morning, Paul decides to skip class and bumps into Sze, who asks about his bruise on his face with him saying he got it from beating up Japanese thugs but Larry suddenly pulls up and apologies for hitting him to hard last night. At night, Paul sneaks into the refugee camp and is shocked to find out Sze has an infant child, but he comes accept the fact and dates her. While shopping for diapers in a supermarket, Sze is falsely by theft by the boss, who insults her and slaps Paul so Dee interferes and starts a fight with the security guard which Larry finds out since the boss is his girlfriend's mother.

After another punishment, Paul and Dee find a letter from their mother and find out their father is sending them to Taiwan, in which they refuse to comply as Paul wants to study in America while Dee dislikes Taiwan's mandatory military service. They blame their father's girlfriend so they call their friends out and destroys her mother's supermarket. However, King Kong and his squad arrives so they flee the scene. King Kong catches up with Paul and Dee and after a scuffle, King Kong shoots and kills Dee while Paul is arrested and imprisoned. In prison, Paul disowns his father in front of everyone and later inflicts self harm.

After his release from prison, Paul's behavior has become more aggressive and engages in a fight in a disco with gangsters who try to hit on Sze. Paul's friend, Roger organises a settlement with the gangsters' boss, who challenges Paul to an auto race, where Paul wins while his opponent's car is crushed and exploded. Later, Paul discovers Sze will be sent to New Guinea so he pleads with his father to allow him to marry her but his father refuses. Upset, Paul goes to see Sze at the refugee camp but gets into a fight with other refugees who were peeking at them so he was arrested where he was taunted by King Kong at the police station. Paul sneaks into the refugee camp again, but this time, King Kong arrives and orders his subordinates to forcibly takes Sze away from him.

Paul decides the settle the score with King Kong and lures him to a closed shopping mall at night where Paul surprises him with a car and chases him while Kong attempts to shoot Paul. After running over King Kong, Paul gets out of his car and slashes King Kong's with a knife and grabs his revolver and continues the chase. King Kong attempts to hide but Paul finds him and challenges him to a gamble to see who can kill the other first. Paul empties King Kong's pistol with one bullet before handing it back to him while Paul backs up his car and speeds toward King Kong. However, King Kong manages to shoot Paul in the head behind his car approaches him and Paul crashes out the mall and dies.

Cast
Andy Lau as Paul Chan (陳保羅), a well-meaning, mild mannered, 17-year-old secondary school student. After witnessing his younger brother being murdered, he becomes aggressive and rebellious, becoming a juvenile delinquent.
Jeem Yim as Dee (大B), Paul's hot-headed and rebellious younger brother who often engages in reckless and illegal activities.
Elliot Ngok as Larry Chan, Paul and Dee's father who is a prison officer and is strict towards his sons, not allowing them much freedom.
Prudence Liew as Sze (阿詩), Paul's girlfriend who is a Vietnamese refugee and mother of an infant child.
Winnie Chin as Larry's girlfriend who Dee greatly dislikes.
Wai Kei-shun
Tin Mat as Mrs. Cheung, Uncle Cheung's young wife who cheated on him.
Stephen Shiu as a rich man whose car was blown up by Paul and Dee and their friends after he insults them. (cameo)
Tai Yuet-ngor
Lau Kwok-sing as King Kong, a police officer who picks on Paul and Dee.
Hui Ying-ying as the mother of Larry's girlfriend who is a supermarket owner and falsely accused Sze of theft.
Chan Po-cheung
Ricky Wong
Ngai Tim-choi as a prison guard.
Rocky Wong as a prison guard.
Ng Wui as Uncle Cheung (張伯), Roger's grandfather who Paul goes to when he is upset.
Cheung Lai-ping as Chiu's date.
Danny Poon as Roger, Paul and Dee's friend and classmate.
Chin Tsi-ang
Yat Poon-chai as a cop.
Cheung Chi-hung as refugee at camp.
Luk Ying-hung as a cop.
Fong Yue
Wong Kung-miu as Paul and Dee's teacher.
Cheung Chok-chow
Ngai Tung-kwa

Theme song
Break Into New Grounds (闖進新領域)
Composer: Michael Lai
Lyricist: Cheng Kwok-kong
Singer: Leslie Cheung

Box office
The film grossed HK$2,554,649 at the Hong Kong box office during its theatrical run from 15 to 22 April 1983 in Hong Kong.

See also
Andy Lau filmography

External links

On the Wrong Track at Hong Kong Cinemagic

On the Wrong Track film review at LoveHKFilm.com

1983 films
1983 action films
1980s action drama films
Hong Kong action films
Hong Kong drama films
Hong Kong auto racing films
Chinese teen films
1980s Cantonese-language films
Films directed by Clarence Fok
Shaw Brothers Studio films
Films set in Hong Kong
Films shot in Hong Kong
1983 drama films
1980s Hong Kong films